Amir Davidson, professionally known as Amir Derakh, is an American musician and record producer. He is currently the guitarist and the synthesizer player for the band Julien-K, and was the guitarist for the band Dead by Sunrise. He was once the guitar synthesizer player in the rock band Orgy, and has also played guitar in the bands Rough Cutt and Jailhouse.

Career 
After graduating in 1981 from Mission Bay High School in San Diego, California, Derakh played lead guitar for local bands Armed & Ready and Emerald. He moved to Los Angeles to replace Craig Goldy in Rough Cutt. He made a guest appearance on Crazy Town's album, The Gift of Game. Julien-K released a remix of Linkin Park lead singer Chester Bennington's solo song "Morning After" which appeared exclusively on the soundtrack for the 2006 film, Underworld: Evolution. Derakh describes the sound of Julien-K as Depeche Mode meets Nine Inch Nails.

Derakh performed backing for Bennington when he performed the song "Let Down" during 2005's ReAct Now: Music & Relief televised concert. He also made an appearance in the 2003 version of the film Freaky Friday and has worked with many other popular bands, including Coal Chamber, Spineshank, Danzig, the eels, Red Tape, Mumiy Troll and Estados Alterados.

Derakh owns two highly successful restaurants in Orange County, California. 2145 & Lola Gaspar, plus a recording & mixing studio in Long Beach, California.

Personal life 

Derakh is of Iranian, Irish, Austrian, Hungarian, and Russian ancestry. He attended UCLA and earned his certificate in producing/engineering.

Derakh is an avid guitar designer. He has worked with Grover Jackson of Jackson Guitars and has personally designed several of the guitars he currently plays (the most famous being The Disruptor). One of his motivations for designing his own guitars is his desire to create something unique yet functional, and having the public wonder "Wow, what is that guy playing?" He also designed a signature model for Yamaha called the AES-AD6 which was made in a very limited factory run and is highly collectable.

Derakh has a son named Michael Melody-Davidson.

According to Metal Sludge, his stage name is meant to imply the phrase "I'm Here to Rock," with the spelling of the last name as a tribute to his Iranian heritage.

Discography 
"Slaves to Humanity" - Battleground, "Behind My Back", "Riot Addict", "I Love It" - producer/engineer/mixer - 2020
"The Intemperate Sons" - Running Man, "Believe", "Wading in the Gray", "Going Crazy", "Remission" - mixer - 2020
"Ghostfeeder" - Invited to the Murder - mixer - 2020
"Hospital Lies" - Ultraviolet - mixer - 2020
Julien-K - Harmonic Disruptor - producer/engineer/mixer - 2019
"By An Ion" - Shadow Knife, "Faces" - mixer - 2019
"Ghostfeeder" - Star Beast - mixer/addl. production - 2018
"Estados Alterados" - Lumisphera - producer/engineer/mixer - 2018
Julien-K - Time Capsule - A Future Retrospective - producer/engineer/mixer - 2018
"Grey Saints" - Steam Catcher", "Crash - producer / engineer / mixer - 2017
"Lovelesslust" - Fashion - producer/engineer/mixer - 2017
Julien-K - California Noir, Chapter Two - Nightlife In Neon - producer/engineer/mixer - 2016
"Fourwaycross" - Discipline - mixer - 2016
 Beta Test - Movie Score/Soundtrack - 2016
"Lovelesslust" - The Car Crash That Ended Her Life Came as No Surprise - mixer - 2016
Mumiy Troll - Malibu Alibi - co-producer/engineer/mixer - various tracks - 2016
Julien-K - California Noir, Chapter One - Analog Beaches & Digital Cities - producer/engineer/mixer - 2015
Mumiy Troll - Pirate Copies - co-producer/engineer/mixer - various tracks - 2015 - #1 Russian Album
"The Crying Spell" - Never Again - mixer - 2015
"Matt's Chance" - Movie Score/Soundtrack - 2014
Mumiy Troll - SOS Matrosu - co-producer/engineer/mixer/remixer - various tracks - 2013 - #1 Russian Album
Julien-K - We're Here With You - producer/engineer - 2012
Sonic Generations Original Soundtrack: Blue Blur - Soundtrack - producer/engineer/mixer for Circuit Freq - Sega - 2011
True Colors: The Best of Sonic the Hedgehog Part 2 - Soundtrack - producer/engineer/mixer for Julien-K - Sega - 2009
Dead by Sunrise - Out of Ashes - pre-production and engineering - Warner Bros. - 2009
Transformers: Revenge of the Fallen (video game) - producer/engineer/mixer for Julien-K score - Activision - 2009
Julien-K - Death to Analog - producer/engineer/mixer - 2009
Transformers - soundtrack - producer/engineer for Julien-K - Warner Bros. - 2007
Underworld: Evolution - soundtrack - producer/engineer/mixer for Chester Bennington vs. Julien-K - Sony - 2007
Shadow the Hedgehog - soundtrack - producer/engineer/mixer for Julien-K - Sega - 2005
Orgy - Punk Statik Paranoia - co-producer/engineer/mixer - D1 - 2004
Red Tape - Radioactivist - producer/mixer - roadrunner - 2004
Sonic Heroes - Soundtrack - producer/engineer/mixer for Julien-K - Sega - 2004
Freaky Friday - Soundtrack - producer/engineer for Halo Friendlies - Hollywood - 2003 - Gold
Coal Chamber- Giving the Devil His Due - engineer/mixer - Roadrunner -2003
Coal Chamber - Dark Days - pre-production & song arrangements - Roadrunner - 2002
Valentine - pre-production & engineering - Warner Bros. - 2001
Zoolander - Soundtrack - co-producer/engineer/mixer for Orgy - Hollywood - 2001
Spineshank - The Height of Callousness - pre-production & song arrangements - Roadrunner - 2000 - Grammy Award Nominated
Scream 3 - Soundtrack - remixer for Orgy - Wind-Up - 2000 - Gold
Orgy - Vapor Transmission - co-producer/engineer - Reprise - 2000 - Gold
Danzig - Satan's Child - mixer - E-Magine - 1999
Coal Chamber - Chamber Music - mixer - Roadrunner - 1999
Spineshank - Strictly Diesel - producer/engineer/mixer - Roadrunner - 1998
Orgy - Candyass - co-producer/engineer - Reprise - 1998 - Platinum
Strangeland - soundtrack - mixer for Coal Chamber - TVT - 1998
Bride of Chucky - soundtrack - mixer for Coal Chamber - CMC - 1998
Rod Stewart tribute album - Forever Mod - Portrait of a Storyteller - producer/engineer/mixer/arranger - DeRock - 1997
Coal Chamber - Coal Chamber - engineer/mixer - Roadrunner - 1997 - Gold
Eels - Beautiful Freak - engineer - DreamWorks - 1996 - Gold - Grammy Award Nominated

References

External links
 Self-description
 
 PopGurls Interview: Amir Derakh
 All About Amir
 Farm2.static.flickr.com

Living people
American rock guitarists
American male guitarists
American people of Iranian descent
American people of Austrian descent
American people of Hungarian descent
American people of Russian descent
American people of Irish descent
Rough Cutt members
Julien-K members
Dead by Sunrise members
Musicians from San Diego
Orgy (band) members
University of California, Los Angeles alumni
20th-century American guitarists
Industrial metal musicians
Year of birth missing (living people)